2005–06 Bosnia and Herzegovina Football Cup was the twelfth season of the Bosnia and Herzegovina's annual football cup, and a sixth season of the unified competition. The competition started on 21 September 2005 with the First Round and concluded on 3 May 2006 with the Final.

First round
Thirty-two teams entered in the First Round. The matches were played on 21 September, 4 and 11 October 2005.

|}

Second round
The 16 winners from the prior round enter this round. The first legs were played on 19 October and the second legs were played on 26 October 2005.
 

|}

Quarterfinals
The eight winners from the prior round enter this round. The first legs were played on 9 November and the second legs were played on 16 November 2005.

|}

Semifinals
The four winners from the prior round enter this round. The first legs will be played on 29 March and the second legs were played on 12 April 2006.

|}

Final

First leg

Second leg

Orašje won 3–0 on aggregate.

Notes

See also
 2005–06 Premier League of Bosnia and Herzegovina

External links
Statistics on RSSSF

Bosnia and Herzegovina Football Cup seasons
Cup
Bosnia